Habesha kemis is the traditional attire of Habesha women.

The ankle length dress is usually worn by Ethiopian and Eritrean women at formal events, holidays and invitations. But it comes in many forms nowadays. It is made of cotton fabric, and typically comes in white, grey or beige shades. Many women also wrap a shawl called a netela around the formal dress.

See also
Bernos
Coffee ceremony
Culture of Ethiopia
Culture of Eritrea
Dashiki
Ethiopian suit
Gabi
Kaftan (boubou)

References

External links

Ethiopian clothing  at Montgomery Blair High School
An article about the people of Ethiopia Embassy of Ethiopia in Japan no content 

Dresses
Ethiopian clothing
Eritrean clothing
Folk costumes
Coffee culture